Żurawniki may refer to the following places:
Żurawniki, Lublin Voivodeship (east Poland)
Żurawniki, Opatów County in Świętokrzyskie Voivodeship (south-central Poland)
Żurawniki, Pińczów County in Świętokrzyskie Voivodeship (south-central Poland)